There are several places with this name. They are all located in Maritime Canada. The name is thought to be derived from the Míkmaq term akatiek 'place', which is pronounced "agadiek".

New Brunswick

 Regional Municipality of Tracadie
 Tracadie-Sheila, the former town at the core of the regional municipality
 Tracadie-Sheila (electoral district)
 Big Tracadie River, the river draining into Tracadie Bay to the south of Tracadie-Sheila
 Little Tracadie River, the river draining into Tracadie Bay through Tracadie-Sheila

Nova Scotia

 Tracadie, Nova Scotia
Upper Big Tracadie, Nova Scotia
 Little Tracadie River 
 Tracadie River 

Prince Edward Island

 Tracadie, Prince Edward Island
 Grand Tracadie
 Tracadie-Fort Augustus Prince Edward Island electoral district

Quebec

 Tracadie lake,  located in Montpellier, Papineau Regional County Municipality, in administrative region of Outaouais.

fr:Tracadie